This is a list of shoe styles and designs. A shoe is an item of footwear intended to protect and comfort the human foot while doing various activities. Shoes are also used as an item of decoration. The design of shoes has varied enormously through time and from culture to culture, with appearance originally being tied to function. Additionally, fashion has often dictated many design elements, such as whether shoes have very high heels or flat ones. Contemporary footwear varies widely in style, complexity and cost. Shoemaking is the process of making footwear. Originally, shoes were made one at a time by hand. Traditional handicraft shoemaking has now been largely superseded in volume of shoes produced by industrial mass production of footwear, but not necessarily in quality, attention to detail, or craftsmanship.

Shoe styles
Shoe designers have described a very large number of shoe styles, including the following:

 Abaca slippers
 
 Air Forces
 
 Bakya
 Balgha
 Ballet boot
 Ballet flat
 Ballet shoe
 Pointe shoe
 Bast shoe
 Biblical sandals
 Blucher
 Boat shoe
 Boot
 Australian work
 Beatle
 Bovver
 Caulk
 Cavalier
 Chap
 Chelsea
 Chukka
 Desert 
 Combat
 Desert combat
 Jungle
 Cowboy
 Dress
 Engineer
 Fashion
 Go-go
 Gutals
 Hessian
 Hiking
 Hip
 Jackboot
 Jodhpur
 Jump
 Knee-high
 Mountaineering
 Rigger
 Safari
 Sheepskin
 Thigh-high
 
 Ugg
 Brogan
 Brogue
 Brothel creeper
 Buskin
 
 
 Cantabrian albarcas
 Chopine
 
 Clear heels
 Cleats
 Climbing shoe
 Clog
 British clog
 Turkish clogs
 Court shoe (British English), pump (American English), or d'Orsay pumps
 Crakow
 Crocs
 Cross country running shoe
 Cycling shoe
 Derby
 Diabetic shoe
 Dress shoe
 Duckbill
 Driving moccasins
 Earth shoe
 Elevator shoes
 Episcopal sandals
 Espadrille
 Flamenco shoe
 Flip-flops
 Furlane
 
 Galoshes
 Geta
 Ghillies
 Giveh
 
 
 Hanfu footwear
 High-heeled footwear
 High-top
 Hiking shoes

 Hnyat-phanat
 Huarache
 
 Jazz shoe
 Jelly shoes
 
 
 Jutti
 Kitten heel
 Klomp
 Kolhapuri chappal
 Kung fu shoe
 Light-up shoes
 Lotus shoes
 Mary Jane
 Mexican pointy boots
 Mojari
 Moccasin
 Monk shoe
 Motorcycle boot
 Mukluk
 Mule
 Multani Khussa
 Namaksin
 
 Opanak
 Opinga
 Organ shoes
 Orthopaedic footwear
 Over-the-knee boot
 Oxford shoe
 Paduka
 Pampootie
 Patten
 Peep-toe shoe
 Peranakan beaded slippers
 
 Pigache
 Platform shoe
 Plimsoll
 Pointinini
 Pulhoer
 Racing flat
 Racing shoes
 Riding boots
 Rocker bottom shoe
 Roller shoe
 Rope-soled shoe
 Russian boot
 Sabot
 Saddle shoe
 Sailing boots
 Sandal
 Coiled sewn
 Ho Chi Minh
 Saltwater

 Self-tying shoes
 Skate shoe
 Ski boot
 Slide
 Slingback
 Slip-on, or loafers
 Slipper
 Sneakers
 Trail running shoes
 Snow boot
 
 Spectator shoe
 Spool heel
 Steel-toe boot
 Stiletto heel
 Tap shoes
 T-bar sandal
 Tiger-head shoes
 Träskor
 Toe shoe
 Tsarouchi
 Turnshoe
 Upanah
 Uwabaki
 Valenki
 Veldskoen
 Venetian-style shoe
 Waders
Walk-Over shoes

Water shoe
 Wedge
 Wellington boot
 Wholecut
 Winklepicker
 Wörishofer
 Wrestling shoe
 Xiuhuaxie
 Zori

See also

 Calceology
 Cordwainer
 Horseshoe
 List of boots
 List of footwear designers
 Locomotor effects of shoes
 Shoeshiner
 Shoe size
 Shoe store
 Shoe tossing
 Shoes on a table
 Sneaker collecting

References

External links
 
 

Shoes
Clothing-related lists